The Image Expedition is an American not-for-profit organization that produces multi-platform projects, which serve to photograph and document indigenous ways of life that are at risk of disappearing. Their projects use fine art photography, museum-quality exhibitions, digital video, websites, and explanatory text.

Background
The Image Expedition was founded in 1990 by Daniel Lorenzetti, funded in part by a grant which Lorenzetti had recently been awarded by the South Florida Cultural Consortium's Visual Artist Fellowship. The editorial director of the Image Expedition is Daniel's wife, Linda Rice Lorenzetti, whose writing has been published in The Adventure of Food: True Stories of Eating Everything (Travelers' Tales, 1999),  and The Birth of Coffee (Random House, 2001).

The Image Expedition states that they are committed to respecting and not imposing upon the cultures that they visit. Daniel Lorenzetti has said, "As Americans, we can't pretend to understand many of these people's lives.  We can only observe them."

The main goal of the organization is to create 'visual artifacts' — "words and images that document ancient sites, unusual occupations and traditional ways of life, many disappearing in the digital age." Examples of visual artifacts preserved by the Image Expedition range from cricket sellers in Beijing's public markets, to the Mingangkabau in Indonesia — one of the last existing matrilineal cultures, to duckherders in Burma, to public human cremation in Bali, to name a few.

Projects
The Image Expedition's pilot project was a one-month trip to Ecuador in 1990, during which they documented diverse communities within the country, from the Andes mountains to the Amazon basin.  In 1995 the team traveled to document rural areas of China, Yemen, Cambodia, and Burma.  In 1996 the team spent two months photographing and gathering stories from Indonesia, specifically the islands of Bali, Java, Sumatra, Kalimatan and Sulawesi. All of the above research culminated in the publication of Collecting Visual Artifacts, published by IX/Lighthouse Press in 1998.

Research for their second project, The Birth of Coffee, began in 1996. The aim of this project is to help the average coffee-drinker to be aware of the difficult process that laborers must endure in order to grow and produce coffee.  A book of their findings from this expedition, The Birth of Coffee, was published by Random House in 2001.

Sponsors
The Image Expedition's work has been made possible by donations from the following sponsors:
Continental Airlines (provides tickets), Sheraton Hotels and Resorts (provides accommodations), Magellan (supplied GPS device), Olympus America (supplies cameras), Ilford (supplies film and paper), Print File (donates photographic and archival supplies), Royal Robbins (supplies travel clothing), Imacon (supplies scanners), Winsor & Newton (supplies easels), Eagle Creek (supplies luggage), Lonely Planet (supplies travel guides), and Dell (supplies laptops).

Collections

The Image Expedition's photographs are in the permanent collections of the Victoria and Albert Museum (London, England), the Corcoran Gallery of Art (Washington, D.C.), and the Santa Barbara Museum of Art (Santa Barbara, CA).

References

External links
The Image Expedition website
The Birth of Coffee website
Linda Rice Lorenzetti's website

American photography organizations
Indigenous organizations
Arts organizations established in 1990
1990 establishments in the United States